Ophelia (Catata) Paquet (born 1864, in Clatsop County, Oregon; died December 25, 1925, in Salem, Marion County, Oregon) was a Tillamook Indian woman involved in a famous Oregon miscegenation court case in year 1919. The case's issue was whether Ophelia Paquet could inherit her deceased Caucasian husband's estate in the U.S. state of Oregon. Her case exemplifies the role that marriage has in the transmission of property and how race can affect gender complications.

Oregon miscegenation laws
The U.S. state of Oregon maintains that "it shall not be lawful within this state for any white person, male or female, to intermarry with any negro, Chinese, or any person having one fourth or more negro, Chinese, or Kanaka blood, or any person having more than one half Indian blood." The law defined interracial marriage as illicit. Also with the preconceived notion that non-Whites were hypersexual. The miscegenation laws of United States generally tended to prohibit interracial marriage rather than interracial sex. Marriage brought economic and social benefits to couples. Miscegenation laws were designed to keep people of color from rising up in socio-economic status.

The case
The case was decided in Oregon Supreme Court over the inheritance of estate of a deceased Caucasian man Fred Paquet to his Tillamook Indian wife Ophelia Paquet. Fred Paquet (born 1862, died September 27, 1919) and Ophelia Paquet were married for more than thirty years. The issue was whether could the Court recognize Fred and Ophelia's marriage. The Court concluded that the marriage violated Oregon's miscegenation law. The estate got ruled to be transferred to Fred Paquet's relative John Paquet. The judges were somewhat sympathetic for Ophelia because of how faithful she was to Fred for over thirty years. There were arguments that Ophelia should get half of the estate. In the end, Ophelia should have gotten a settlement on the basis that she clears her claims of ownership of the estate. It was not clear whether Ophelia agreed upon and received the settlement.

The significance of the case
Ophelia Paquet's case brought attention to connection of race and transmission of property. Miscegenation laws kept property within racial bounds by only validating marriages between white men and white women and invalidating marriages between white men and non-white women. Interracial marriages were not recognized by miscegenation laws. Race can be seen as property within the context of miscegenation laws. To keep property in the hands of Whites and prevent non-Whites from gaining property.

The case also raised attention of how dependent women were on men economically. Women were perceived to be dependent on men domestically during the early twentieth century. Ophelia Paquet's case dispelled that. Her husband Fred was away from the estate a lot and her wage work provided a lot of the income for the estate.

References

 Oregon Codes and Stats., 1901, Chap. 8, Sec. 1999 (1866)
 Pascoe, Peggy. "Ophelia Paquet, a Tillamook Indian Wife: Miscegenation Laws and the Privileges of Property." 363-368

Confederated Tribes of Siletz Indians
Oregon state case law
Inheritance
Interracial marriage in the United States
1919 in Oregon
1919 in United States case law
20th-century Native American women
20th-century Native Americans
People from Clatsop County, Oregon
1864 births
1925 deaths
Anti-indigenous racism in the United States